The Women's 800m Freestyle at the 2007 World Aquatics Championships took place on the morning of 30 March (prelims) and the evening of 31 March (finals) at the Rod Laver Arena in Melbourne, Australia.

The existing records when the event started were:
World Record (WR):  8:16.22, Janet Evans (USA), 20 August 1989 in Tokyo, Japan.
Championship Record (CR): 8:23.66, Hannah Stockbauer (Germany), Barcelona 2003 (Jul.26.2003)

Results

Finals

Preliminaries

References

Women's 800m Freestyle Preliminary results from the 2007 World Championships. Published by OmegaTiming.com (official timer of the '07 Worlds); Retrieved 2009-07-01.
Women's 800m Freestyle Final results from the 2007 World Championships. Published by OmegaTiming.com (official timer of the '07 Worlds); Retrieved 2009-07-01.

Swimming at the 2007 World Aquatics Championships
2007 in women's swimming